Iceland participated in the Eurovision Song Contest 2021 in Rotterdam, Netherlands.

A music video for "10 Years" and a tie-in mobile game were released ahead of the contest to promote the entry. A COVID-19 infection among the members of Daði  meant that the group were unable to perform "10 Years" live during the contest, however Iceland remained in the competition and competed using rehearsal footage recorded in the contest's arena in the days before the event. Iceland placed 2nd in the second semi-final, held on 20 May 2021, receiving 288 points, and qualified for the final held two days later, where the nation placed 4th with 378 points.

Background 

Prior to the 2021 contest, Iceland had participated in the Eurovision Song Contest 32 times following its first entry in 1986 and had failed to participate on only two occasions since their debut. The contest has been broadcast in Iceland since as early as 1970, but the geographically-remote nation was prevented from competing until a stable satellite connection could be established to enable live transmission of it. In , Iceland marked their fourth consecutive non-qualification when Ari Ólafsson and the song "Our Choice" placed 19th and last in the first semi-final, standing as the country's worst result at the contest.

The Icelandic national broadcaster,  (RÚV), broadcasts the event within Iceland and organises the selection process for the nation's entry. The Icelandic broadcaster has used various methods to select the Icelandic entry in the past, such as internal selections and televised national finals to choose the performer and song to compete at Eurovision. Since 2006, RÚV has chosen its entry for Eurovision through , a televised music competition; this method was used ahead of the 2020 contest, the winner of  2020 being Daði og Gagnamagnið with the song "Think About Things". The 2020 contest was subsequently cancelled due to the rapid spread across Europe of the coronavirus disease 2019 (COVID-19); shortly afterwards the European Broadcasting Union (EBU) confirmed that entries for the 2020 contest would not be eligible for the next edition in 2021. In September 2020, RÚV confirmed its intention to participate in the 2021 contest, subsequently announcing on 23 October 2020 that Daði  would remain as the nation's Eurovision entrant.

Before Eurovision

Internal selection
Concurrently with confirming that Daði  would represent Iceland in the 2021 contest, RÚV announced that their song for the contest would also be chosen internally, meaning that for the first time since , Iceland's traditional national selection process  would not be held. The announcement came soon after Daði Freyr announced changes to his already-confirmed European tour in 2020 and 2021, with many dates shifted due to the ongoing COVID-19 pandemic, including changes for the May 2021 dates that would allow him to perform at Eurovision. In an interview with NME in November 2020, Daði shared the process for writing his new Eurovision entry, stating that from around 11 rough demos he had been working on, he would subsequently focus on one for the contest. By the end of December 2020, Daði confirmed through his Twitter account that the lyrics for the entry had been completed.

In January 2021, Daði announced a campaign for submissions from the general public to be part of a virtual backing choir which would be utilised in his entry for Eurovision. This followed changes to the Eurovision Song Contest rules which for the first time allowed the use of pre-recorded backing vocals. Interested individuals were invited to submit audio files of themselves performing one of seven vocal parts which would make up the backing choir. Within two days around 250 samples had been submitted for the choir, including one from Jendrik Sigwart, who was later selected to represent Germany in the same contest.

On 24 February 2021, Daði revealed that his entry for Eurovision 2021 would be entitled "10 Years", slated for release on 13 March 2021. At the same time, he stated that the song would reference his decade-long relationship with his wife Árný Fjóla. Ahead of the song's release, RÚV aired a two-part documentary series on 27 February and 6 March 2021, detailing the history of the singer, Daði  and their journey to Eurovision 2021. "10 Years" received its first official performance on a special Eurovision edition of RÚV's  on 13 March; however, the song was leaked online two days prior to the show.

Promotion 
To promote the entry, a music video for "10 Years" was released on 29 March 2021. Directed by Guðný Rós Þórhallsdóttir, the video features Icelandic actor Ólafur Darri Ólafsson and portrays Daði  as superheroes saving Reykjavík from monsters. Ahead of the contest, Daði Freyr also confirmed that "10 Years" was likely to be the group's last song together, as they were originally envisioned as a temporary lineup for Daði's  performances.

Daði  also released a mobile game in the run-up to the contest. Titled Think About Aliens and inspired by 16-bit era games, the game was developed by Icelandic game developers Byssuthur and was released on Android and iOS operating systems. Featuring music by Daði Freyr, including "10 Years" and his previous  entries "Is This Love?" and "Think About Things", the player controls a representation of Daði as he attempts to save the members of the group who have been abducted by music-hating aliens.

At Eurovision 
The Eurovision Song Contest 2021 took place at Rotterdam Ahoy in Rotterdam, the Netherlands, and consisted of two semi-finals held on the respective dates of 18 and 20 May, and the final on 22 May 2021. According to Eurovision rules, all nations with the exceptions of the host country and the "Big Five" (France, Germany, Italy, Spain and the United Kingdom) are required to qualify from one of two semi-finals in order to compete for the final; the top 10 countries from each semi-final progress to the final. The EBU split up the competing countries into six different pots based on voting patterns from previous contests as determined by the contest's televoting partner Digame. The semi-final allocation draw held for the Eurovision Song Contest 2020 on 28 January 2020 was used for the 2021 contest, which placed Iceland into the second semi-final, to be held on 20 May, scheduled to perform in the first half of the show. Once all the competing songs for the 2021 contest had been released, the running order for the semi-finals was decided by the shows' producers rather than through another draw, so that similar songs were not placed next to each other. Iceland was set to perform in eighth, following the entry from Moldova and preceding the entry from Serbia.

The two semi-finals and the final were televised in Iceland on RÚV with commentary by Gísli Marteinn Baldursson; on RÚV 2 with Icelandic Sign Language provided by Elsa G. Björnsdóttir; and streamed online on ruv.is with English commentary by Alex Elliott. The second semi-final and the final were also broadcast via radio on Rás 2.

Performances 
The Icelandic delegation took park in technical rehearsals at Rotterdam Ahoy on 10 and 13 May 2021. The performance featured Daði  in matching turquoise-green sweaters emblazoned with pixellated versions of each individual member's face; half of the group, including Daði Freyr, performed in front of microphone stands, while the other half performed with curved keytars. On 16 May 2021, a positive COVID-19 test was detected for one member of the Icelandic delegation as part of routine testing organised by the contest organisers; subsequently this meant that the entire Icelandic delegation were placed into self-isolation and underwent further PCR testing, and were forced to miss the "Turquoise Carpet" welcome event held on 16 May. On 19 May 2021, following further tests, the EBU and RÚV announced that Daði  Jóhann Sigurður Jóhannsson had subsequently tested positive for COVID-19, with all other delegation members testing negative; as such the group did not perform in dress rehearsals on 19 and 20 May, and were unable to perform live during the second semi-final, as they wished to only appear if all members could participate. However the song remained in the competition, with footage from their second technical rehearsal on 13 May 2021 being utilised during the semi-final as Daði  watched the show from their hotel room.

The contest's second semi-final was held on 20 May 2021 and Iceland was the sixth country of the ten to be announced as having qualified for the final. It was later revealed that the entry placed second in the semi-final, receiving a total of 288 points. Soon after, the EBU posted the running order for the final, placing Iceland in position 12, following Switzerland and preceding Spain. The group's rehearsal footage was utilised again in the final, held on 22 May 2021; at the close of voting "10 Years" placed 4th in the field of 26, receiving 378 points.

Voting 

Below is a breakdown of points awarded to Iceland in the second semi-final, as well as by the country in the final. Voting during the three shows involved each country awarding two sets of points from 1–8, 10 and 12: one from their professional jury and the other from televoting. The exact composition of the professional jury and the results of each country's jury and televoting were released after the final; the individual results from each jury member were also released in an anonymised form. Iceland's jury consisted of Gudrun Gunnars, Matti Matt, Oddny Sturludottir, Regína Ósk and Snorri Helgason. In the second semi-final, Iceland placed 2nd with a total of 288 points, thus qualifying for the final. The performance received 148 televoting points, which included the maximum 12 awarded by Denmark, Finland and the United Kingdom. The jury points added to 140, including 12 from Latvia, Serbia and the United Kingdom again. In the final, Iceland placed 4th with 378 points, receiving 180 televoting points and 198 jury points, and gaining a total of four maximum 12 points scores, from the Austrian jury and the Australian, Danish and Finnish public. Over the course of the contest, the Icelandic jury awarded its 12 points to Switzerland in both the second semi-final and the final, and the Icelandic public awarded its 12 points to Denmark in the semi-final and to Finland in the final. Hannes Óli Ágústsson served as Iceland's spokesperson for the voting portion of the final, announcing the country's jury votes. The Icelandic actor announced the points in character as Olaf Yohansson, also known as the "Ja Ja Ding Dong Guy", from the film Eurovision Song Contest: The Story of Fire Saga (2020).

Points awarded to Iceland

Points awarded by Iceland

Detailed voting results 
The following members comprised the Icelandic jury:
  (Gudrun Gunnars)
 Snorri Helgason
 Matthías Matthíasson (Matti Matt)
 
 Regína Ósk Óskarsdóttir (Regina Ósk)

References

External links 
 

2021
Countries in the Eurovision Song Contest 2021
Eurovision